Sir James Fitzjames Duff (1 February 1898 – 24 April 1970) was an English academic and Vice-chancellor of Durham University.

The son of James Duff Duff, he was educated at Winchester College then (after serving in the Royal Flying Corps from 1916–1917) at Trinity College, Cambridge. In the 1920s, he conducted pioneering research with Godfrey Thomson on the relationship between IQ and social class, now regarded as controversial. He was Professor of Education at the University of Manchester from 1932 to 1937, then Warden of Durham University from 1937 until 1960. During this time, he held the position of Vicechancellor for 6 periods of two years, in alternation with the Rector of King's College, Newcastle.

Duff was a member of several commissions and enquiries, including the Asquith Commission on Higher Education in the Colonies (1943–1945), the
Elliot Commission on Higher Education in West Africa (1943–1944), and the University Education Commission of India (1948–1949).

He was a member and interim Chairman of the Board of Governors of the BBC from 1959 to 1965, Mayor of Durham City from 1959 to 1960, and Lord Lieutenant of Durham from 1964 to 1970.

Duff was knighted in 1949. He never married, and died in Dublin on 24 April 1970, aged 72.

Publications

Notes

References

1898 births
1970 deaths
People educated at Winchester College
Alumni of Trinity College, Cambridge
Academics of the Victoria University of Manchester
Knights Bachelor
Lord-Lieutenants of Durham
Vice-Chancellors and Wardens of Durham University